"Rage Hard" is the fifth single by Frankie Goes to Hollywood. It was released on 25 August 1986.

Background
Having topped the charts around the world with Welcome to the Pleasuredome and its accompanying singles, Frankie Goes to Hollywood took off to Amsterdam to record the follow-up album, Liverpool. Taking on a rockier edge, "Rage Hard" was the first single culled from the disc.

Of note, "Rage Hard" was a testament to the changing musical landscape in Britain at the time. It was not only the first Frankie single to be featured on CD single, it was also the first single to not feature a cassette release - new rules limited the number of items that could count towards the official charts, following the earlier ZTT excesses.

"Rage Hard" eventually hit Number 4 in the UK singles charts and Number 1 in Germany (for two weeks), #5 in Switzerland, #7 in the Netherlands, #12 in Austria, #19 in Sweden and #32 in France.

B-sides 

The B-sides to "Rage Hard" were, for the most part, straight forward cover songs. Firstly there was a cover of David Bowie's 1972 glam-rock classic "Suffragette City", slightly renamed to "SuffRAGEtte City" to fit in with the "Rage Hard" promotion. The second cover song was "Roadhouse Blues" by The Doors which featured on the 2nd 12". A shorter version features on the CD single.

The original B-side is an odd composition entitled "(Don't Lose What's Left) Of Your Little Mind". It was released in two versions, a 4-minute mix and a 6-minute mix and featured Holly Johnson & Brian (Nasher) Nash imitating Count von Count ("Ha ha ha/I am the Count") from the children's TV show Sesame Street. This was complemented by sampled burps and belches over a backing track.

Track listing

7": ZTT / ZTAS 22 United Kingdom 
"rage rage"

 "Rage Hard" (7" mix) - 5:05
 "(Don't Lose What's Left) Of Your Little Mind" - 4:03
 The standard release features all five coloured fists on the cover
 20,000 copies in a pop-up gatefold sleeve (with the Rage Hard fists being the pop-up) (sleeve featured the Orange fist) (ZTD22)

7": ZTT / ZTAX 22 United Kingdom 
 "Rage Hard" (stamped) - 4:55
 "(Don't Lose What's Left) Of Your Little Mind" - 4:03

 Stamped is an edit of the "Broad Mix" from the 2nd 12" (sleeve featured the Blue fist)
 Was released to celebrate the song entering #6 on the UK charts on 6 September 1986.
 (All discographical information pertains to UK releases only)

12": ZTT / 12 ZTAS 22 United Kingdom 
"Slam Bam"

 "Rage Hard" (The Young Person's Guide To The 12" Mix) - 12:08
 "[The B-side]" + "SuffRAGEtte City" (David Bowie) - 3:31
 "(Don't Lose What's Left) Of Your Little Mind" - 6:15
 "['always note the sequencer...']" - 0:22
 An edit (10:05) of this mix is also known as "Young Person's Guide Into The 12-inch"
 This 12" was also released with a 12" x 24" poster (12 ZTAQ 22), 20,000 copies.
 Also released on German CD (Island / 658 434)

12": ZTT / 12 ZTAX 22 United Kingdom 
 "Rage Hard" (Broad Mix) - 8:36
 "Roadhouse Blues" - 4:03
 "(Don't Lose What's Left) Of Your Little Mind" - 6:15
 "['always note the sequencer...']" - 0:22

 (sleeve featured the Yellow fist)
 Note: 12ZTAX22 also came in a limited edition cardboard box which was designed to contain the complete set of Rage Hard UK releases. The front of the box lists the relevant catalogue numbers of the intended contents, minus the Stamped mix 7" single which is not listed. The box, called "The Total" had a sticker which made it clear that only 12 ZTAX 22 was included. It is still not established whether any box sets with their intended contents were ever officially released or indeed sold by record stores, but it's highly likely that some stores sold a complete set on request, if not officially.
 "Broad Mix" also known as "Rage Hard ⊕⊕"
 Track 2 is labelled as "Broadhouse Blues" on the sleeve.
 Track 3 is labelled as "(Don't Loose What's Left) Of Your Little Mind" on the front sleeve

CD: ZTT / CD ZCID 22 United Kingdom 
 "Rage Hard (⊕⊕⊕✪)" - 17:12
 "SuffRAGEtte City" - 3:31
 "["Don't lose what's left.."]" + "Roadhouse Blues" (compacted) - 3:54

(sleeve featured the Purple fist)
(⊕⊕⊕✪ is a combined edit of Stamped, The Young Person's Guide to the 12" and Broad.)

Tracks 1 and 3.1 was rereleased in 2012 on CD Sexmix Disk 1, Tracks 14 and 15.

12": Island / DMD 987 United States 
 "Rage Hard" (Freddie Bastone Vocal Remix) - 7:00
 "Rage Hard" (Freddie Bastone Remix Edit) - 4:03
 "Rage Hard" (Freddie Bastone Remix Dub) - 5:30
 US Promo 12"

Digital download: ZTT
 "Rage Hard" (7" mix) - 5:09
 "Rage Hard" (Stamped) - 5:00
 "Rage Hard" (7" mix, instrumental) [labelled as "Voiceless"] - 5:07
 "Rage Hard" (The Young Person's Guide To The 12" Mix) [labelled as "⊕"] - 12:07
 "Rage Hard" (Broad Mix) [labelled as "⊕⊕"] - 8:42
 "Suffragette City" - 3:35
 "(Don't Lose What's Left) Of Your Little Mind" - 6:15
 "Roadhouse Blues" - 4:07
 "['always note the sequencer...']" [labelled as "Rage Hard (⊕⊕ Coda)"] - 0:24
Later versions replace "Voiceless" with the "Monetrux Mix" (5:34).
 Track 1 is actually the album version with the spoken intro.

1993 Version
In 1993, a version of the song appeared on the b side of The Power Of Love reissue (FGTH 3) entitled "Original DJ mix". This version is the original 7" mix from 1986, but with the first chorus removed. Instead, the first verse and second verse are jointed together. This release can also be found on a large centre hole 7" disc with the label details stamped into the naked vinyl, as opposed to a paper or printed label.

Chart performance

Weekly charts

Year-end charts

References 

Frankie Goes to Hollywood songs
1986 singles
Number-one singles in Germany
1986 songs
Song recordings produced by Stephen Lipson